Jordan Zevon (born August 7, 1969) is an American singer, musician and songwriter. He is the son of rock musician Warren Zevon.

Following his father's death in 2003, Jordan, his half-sister, Ariel, and longtime Zevon collaborator Jorge Calderón accepted Warren's two posthumous Grammy Awards for Best Rock Vocal Performance and Best Contemporary Folk Album for The Wind. His father's death from mesothelioma moved Jordan to be a National Spokesperson for the Asbestos Disease Awareness Organization as an advocate for those harmed by exposure to asbestos. He appeared on the 2004 tribute album Enjoy Every Sandwich: Songs of Warren Zevon singing the previously unreleased song "Studebaker". In 2005, he appeared on another tribute album called Hurry Home Early: the Songs of Warren Zevon, issued by Wampus Multimedia, where he sang another unreleased song called "Warm Rain" with Simone Stevens.

In 2005, Zevon released his self-titled debut EP through his production company Mixed Headache. His first full-length album, Insides Out, was released through Texas-based New West Records on April 15, 2008. Shortly after, on August 26, 2008 he adopted his daughter Willow Zevon at birth.

On June 7, 2007, Zevon appeared on the Late Show with David Letterman and again on April 18, 2008. In 2008, he won the Overall Grand Prize of the prestigious 14th Annual USA Songwriting Competition with his song "Home".

Zevon is currently working on a new album entitled Imperfect, which he has described to be "darker and more rock than power pop" compared to his previous work. He has stated that it will feature the tracks "May or May Not", "Not Like Me", "Merry Go Wrong", "Wrecking Ball", "The Epic Fail" and "Stick With Me". On August 4, 2011, he released a demo take of the song "Wrecking Ball" on his personal website.

Zevon was executive producer for a motion picture $pent (2000).

Discography 

 Jordan Zevon (EP) (2005)
 Insides Out (2008)

Honors 

 Overall Grand Prize — U.S.A. Songwriting Competition – "Home" 2008
 Best Pop Song — U.S.A. Songwriting Competition - "Home" 2008
 Best Pop Song — U.S.A. Songwriting Competition – "Jokes On Me" 2006
 3rd Prize Overall — U.S.A. Songwriting Competition – "Insides Out" 2006

References

External links 
Jordan Zevon's Webpage
New West Records
 
Insides Out on Lala.com
USA Songwriting Competition

1969 births
University High School (Los Angeles) alumni
American people of Russian descent
New West Records artists
Living people
Warren Zevon
American rock musicians